Kiwoko is a small town in the Central Region of Uganda. It is one of the municipalities in Nakaseke District.

Location
The coordinates of the town are:0°50'39.0"N, 32°21'41.0"E (Latitude:0.844174; Longitude:32.361383).

Population
During the national census and household survey of 27 and 28 August 2014, the Uganda Bureau of Statistics (UBOS), enumerated the population of Butalangu at 11,013 people.

Points of interest
The following points of interest are found within the town limits or near its edges: (a) The offices of Kiwoko Town Council (b) Kiwoko Hospital - A 250-bed community hospital, administered by the Church of Uganda. (c) Kiwoko central market and (d) Luweero–Butalangu Road - This  road passes through the town of Kiwoko is a general east to west direction.

Photos
Photos of Kiwoko at Flickr.com

See also
 Luweero triangle

References

External links
Nakaseke to be turned into industrial town- Museveni
 USh170m for Nakaseke feeder roads

Luweero District
Populated places in Central Region, Uganda
Cities in the Great Rift Valley